Oreolalax granulosus is a species of amphibian in the family Megophryidae.
Being restricted to the vicinity of its type locality in Jingdong County in southern Yunnan, where it occurs in Ailaoshan National Nature Reserve. It is endemic to China.
Its natural habitats are subtropical moist montane forests and rivers.
It is threatened by habitat loss.

References

granulosus
Amphibians of China
Endemic fauna of Yunnan
Taxonomy articles created by Polbot
Amphibians described in 1990